Treehouse is the fifth studio album by American electronicore band I See Stars released on June 17, 2016 through Sumerian Records. It is their first studio album not to feature vocalist and keyboardist Zach Johnson and guitarist Jimmy Gregerson, who were both asked to leave the band in 2015. It is also the band's first album since their 2013 release, New Demons, marking their longest gap between studio album releases. The album was produced by Erik Ron, Nick Scott, Taylor Larson, and David Bendeth.

Track listing
Song titles adapted from the album's iTunes Store listing.

Personnel
I See Stars
 Brent Allen – guitars
 Andrew Oliver – keyboards, synthesizers, sequencer, programming, backing vocals; co-lead vocals on "Light in the Cave".
 Devin Oliver – lead vocals
 Jeff Valentine – bass guitar

Additional musicians
 Luke Holland – drums, percussion
 Nick Scott - production, guitar, programming (tracks 1-3, 5-12), mixing and mastering (track 9)
 Erik Ron - production (tracks 1-3, 5-8, 10-12), mixing and mastering (track 6)
 David Bendeth - mixing and mastering (track 4)
 Taylor Larson - mixing and mastering (tracks 1-3, 5, 7-8, 10-12)
 Jayda Taylor - songwriting, production
Joey Valentine - songwriting

Charts

References

I See Stars albums
Sumerian Records albums
2016 albums
Albums produced by Erik Ron